Hosaka (written: 保坂) is a Japanese surname. Notable people with the surname include:

Edward Yataro Hosaka (1907–1961), American botanist
, Japanese professional wrestler
, Japanese footballer
, Japanese writer
Malia Hosaka (born 1969), American professional wrestler
, Japanese politician
Nobuyuki Hosaka (born 1970), Japanese footballer
, Japanese politician
, Japanese footballer and manager

Japanese-language surnames